Monardella sheltonii is a species of flowering plant in the mint family known by the common name Shelton's monardella.

It is native to the mountains of northern California and southern Oregon, including the Klamath Mountains and Sierra Nevada, where it grows in chaparral, forest, and other habitat, often on serpentine soils.

Description
Monardella sheltonii is a rhizomatous perennial herb producing an erect stem lined with pairs of oppositely arranged lance-shaped leaves. The inflorescence is a head of several flowers blooming in a cup of leaflike bracts 1 to 3 centimeters wide. The five-lobed purple flowers are 1 to 2 centimeters long.

The Concow tribe called the plant bul-luk’-tō (Konkow language).

References

External links
 Calflora Database: Monardella sheltoni (Shelton's coyote mint, Shelton's monardella)
 Jepson Manual eFlora (TJM2) treatment ofMonardella sheltonii
 USDA Plants Profile
 UC Photos gallery: Monardella sheltonii

sheltonii
Flora of California
Flora of Oregon
Flora of the Klamath Mountains
Flora of the Sierra Nevada (United States)
Natural history of the California chaparral and woodlands
Natural history of the California Coast Ranges
Taxa named by John Torrey
Flora without expected TNC conservation status